Bishunpurwa is a village in Narkatiaganj block of West Champaran district in the Indian state of Bihar.

Demographics
As of 2011 India census, Bishunpurwa had a population of 2850 in 531 households. Males constitute 52.73% of the population and females 47.26%. Bishunpurwa has an average literacy rate of 37.33%, lower than the national average of 74%: male literacy is 60.5%, and female literacy is 39.4%. In Bishunpurwa, 22.5% of the population is under 6 years of age.

References

Villages in West Champaran district